Dynex Semiconductor based in Lincoln, England, United Kingdom is a global supplier of products and services specialising in the field of power semiconductor devices and silicon on sapphire integrated circuit products. The power products they manufacture include IGBTs, various types of thyristor and GTOs.

Research partnerships
Along with several other industry partners, Dynex is a member of the National Microelectronics Institute of the University of Surrey Dynex also supports research in power conversion electronics for hybrid vehicles with two other British universities, Durham University and the University of Warwick

History
The Dynex power semiconductor business was originally established in Lincoln over 50 years ago when it was known as AEI Semiconductors Ltd. At that time, the business introduced some of the first silicon-based power semiconductor components in the world. Since then it acquired the power semiconductor interests, technologies and products from some major names such as GEC, SGS-Thomson, Alstom and Marconi Electronic Devices (MEDL).

Chinese takeover
In 2008, 75% of Dynex Power shares were acquired by Chinese manufacturer Zhuzhou CSR Times Electric Co., Ltd., a subsidiary of CSR Corporation Limited. A 2018 report in The Sunday Times asked if this acquisition led to China using British technology to build a railgun.

References

External links
 Official website

Semiconductor companies of the United Kingdom
Companies based in Lincoln, England
CRRC Group